Jennifer Majura Indrasen (born 16 June 1983) is a German musician. She was the rhythm guitarist for American rock band Evanescence from 2015 to 2022.

Biography 
Majura was born in Stuttgart, West Germany, and started in music at the age of six. Her father is Thai and was one of the founding members of the Reutlingen-based German NDW band KIZ as bassist, her mother is German. Majura has played professionally since 2000. She featured on Rage's "Lord of the Flies" track and toured with the band from 2006 to 2009 on several international tours.

Majura was the founder of AC/DC cover band Black Thunder Ladies (lead guitarist and backings). She had since played in Knorkator (guitarist, 2012–2014), Equilibrium (bass, 2014) and Evanescence (guitarist, 2015–2022). In August 2015, Evanescence frontwoman Amy Lee announced that Majura would replace guitarist Terry Balsamo in the band. In November 2015, Equilibrium announced that Majura had parted ways with the band to join Evanescence. In May 2022, Evanescence parted ways with Majura.

Discography

Studio albums 
 Jen Majura (2015)
 Inzenity (2017)

With Evanescence 
 Synthesis (2017)
 The Bitter Truth (2021)

References

External links 

 Jen Majura official website

1983 births
21st-century bass guitarists
21st-century German musicians
21st-century German women singers
German heavy metal bass guitarists
German people of Thai descent
German women guitarists
German women singer-songwriters
Musicians from Stuttgart
Living people
Rhythm guitarists
Women bass guitarists
Women in metal